The Military ranks of Slovakia are the military insignia used by the Slovak Armed Forces. Slovakia is a landlocked country, and therefore does not possess a navy.

Commissioned officer ranks
The rank insignia of commissioned officers.

Other ranks
The rank insignia of non-commissioned officers and enlisted personnel.

1990-2015
Enlisted for the Army from 1990 to 2015.

See also
 Military ranks of Slovakia (1939-1945)

Notes

References

External links
 

Slovakia
Military of Slovakia